Milan Petošević (born July 28, 1991) is a Serbian footballer.

External links

1991 births
Living people
Saint Louis FC players
Association football midfielders
Serbian footballers
Serbian expatriate footballers
Expatriate footballers in Bosnia and Herzegovina
Expatriate soccer players in the United States
Expatriate footballers in Montenegro
Expatriate footballers in Austria
FK Bežanija players
FK Šumadija 1903 players
FK Slavija Sarajevo players
FK Iskra Danilovgrad players
FK Dinamo Vranje players